Kentucky state elections in 2018 were held on Tuesday, November 6, 2018, with the primary elections being held on May 22, 2018.  These midterm elections occurred during the presidency of Republican Donald Trump and the governorship of Republican Matt Bevin, alongside other elections in the United States.  All six of Kentucky's seats in the United States House of Representatives, nineteen of the 38 seats in the Kentucky State Senate, all 100 seats in the Kentucky House of Representatives, and one of the seven seats on the Kentucky Supreme Court were contested.  Numerous county and local elections were also contested within the state.

In the United States House of Representatives, all six of Kentucky's incumbent congressional representatives won their individual elections. With 59.59% of ballots cast in favor of the Republican congressional candidates, the Republican party maintained its five-seat majority within the congressional delegation; Representative John Yarmuth of Kentucky's 3rd congressional district maintained his position as the only Democrat in the United States Congress from Kentucky. All six of Kentucky's incumbent representatives were reelected with at least 60% of the vote in their respective districts.  Aside from the election in Kentucky's 1st congressional district, all incumbents were challenged by at least one Libertarian or Independent candidate, though no third-party candidates were able to obtain more than 2.5% of the vote.

In the Kentucky General Assembly, Democrats made a net gain of one seat, while Republicans maintained their supermajorities in both chambers of the state legislature.  As the office of governor was not contested in the 2018 elections, Republicans maintained their state-level trifecta established in the 2016 elections.  As Kentucky's judicial elections are non-partisan, there was no change in the partisan makeup of the Kentucky Supreme Court.

While voter turnout in the United States as a whole reached its highest point seen in a midterm election since 1914, Kentucky voter turnout remained unaffected.  With approximately 45.90% of Kentucky's 3.4 million registered voters casting ballots in the election, turnout as a percentage of registered voters remained unchanged from 2014 levels, although the total number of ballots cast did increase.

During the campaign, Democrats focused heavily on public education and teacher pay, frequently attacking Republicans for their support of, among other issues, a controversial overhaul to Kentucky's teacher pension system.  Republican messaging centered around a theme of maintaining their trifecta, with claims that a divided legislature would not be able to get anything done.

Congress

House of Representatives

In the 2018 elections, Democrats sought to take control of the United States House of Representatives for the first time since the 2010 elections. 
As all 6 of Kentucky's voting seats in the 435 member House of Representatives were up for election to serve two-year terms, the Kentucky Democratic Party sought to capitalize on an expected increase in voter turnout to take control of at least two of Kentucky's House seats.

While nationwide the 2018 House elections saw the largest number of retirements by incumbents of any election cycle since at least 1992, none of Kentucky's incumbent Representatives chose to retire.  The lack of Republican retirements may have harmed Democratic prospects in the 2018 mid-term elections due to the incumbency advantage.

Kentucky General Assembly

Kentucky State Senate

Overview

District 2
Candidates
Danny Carroll (Republican), incumbent State Senator since 2014.
Julie Tennyson (Democratic), patent attorney from Paducah, Kentucky.
Results

District 4
Candidates
Dorsey Ridley (Democratic), incumbent State Senator since 2006.
Robby Mills (Republican), former member of the Kentucky House of Representatives for District 11 from 2017 to 2019.
Results

District 6
Candidates
C. B. Embry Jr. (Republican), incumbent State Senator since 2014.
Crystal Chappell (Democratic), special education teacher from Drakesboro, Kentucky.
Results

District 8
Candidates
Matt Castlen (Republican), former member of the Kentucky House of Representatives, representing District 14 from 2017 to 2018.
Bob Glenn (Democratic), three-term Owensboro City Commissioner.
Results

District 10
Candidates
Dennis Parrett (Democratic), incumbent State Senator since 2011.  Senate minority whip since 2017. 
Results

District 12
Candidates
Alice Forgy Kerr (Republican), incumbent State Senator since 1998.
Paula Setser-Kissick (Democratic), schoolteacher.
Results

District 14
Candidates
Jimmy Higdon (Republican), incumbent State Senator since 2009.
Stephanie Compton (Democratic).
Results

District 16
Candidates
Max Wise (Republican), incumbent State Senator since 2014.
Nicole Britton (Write-In).
Results

District 18
Candidates
Robin Webb (Democratic), incumbent State Senator since 2008.
Scott Sharp (Republican), retired senior special agent at the United States Army Criminal Investigation Command.
Results

District 20
Candidates
Paul Hornback (Republican), incumbent State Senator since 2010.
Dave Suetholz (Democratic), lawyer.
Results

District 22
Candidates
Tom Buford (Republican), incumbent State Senator since 1990.
Carolyn Dupont (Democratic), professor at Eastern Kentucky University.
Results

District 24
Candidates
Wil Schroder (Republican), incumbent State Senator since 2014.
Rachel Roberts (Democratic), entrepreneur.
Results

District 26
Candidates
Ernie Harris (Republican), incumbent State Senator since 1994.
Karen Berg (Democratic), diagnostic radiologist.
Jody Hurt (Independent).
Results

District 28
Candidates
Ralph Alvarado (Republican), incumbent State Senator since 2014.
Denise Gray (Democratic), educator with Fayette County Public Schools.
Results

District 30
Candidates
Brandon Smith (Republican), incumbent State Senator since 2008.
Paula Celemons-Combs (Democratic).
Results

District 32
Candidates
Mike Wilson (Republican), incumbent State Senator since 2010.
Jeanie Smith (Democratic), social studies teacher.
Results

District 34
Candidates
Jared Carpenter (Republican), incumbent State Senator since 2010.
Susan Byrne Haddix (Democratic).
Results

District 36
Candidates
Julie Raque Adams (Republican), incumbent State Senator since 2014.
Sheri Donahue (Democratic).
Results

District 38
Candidates
Dan Seum (Republican), incumbent State Senator since 1994.
Brenda Sue Board (Independent).
Andrew Bailey (Write-In)
Results

Kentucky House of Representatives
In the 2018 elections, Democrats sought to regain control of the Kentucky House of Representatives, which had been lost following the 2016 elections. All 100 voting seats in the House of Representatives were up for election to serve two-year terms.  At the time of the election, Republicans held a supermajority of 62 seats to Democrats 37, with one vacant seat.

The 2018 House elections saw fifteen of the state House's members retiring.  Prior to the election, 7 House Republicans and 8 House Democrats had announced their retirement or resignation, with most declining to run for reelection in order to pursue higher office.

Overview

Kentucky Supreme Court
The Kentucky Supreme Court is composed of seven justices who are elected in nonpartisan elections by voters. A full term on the court is eight years. Kentucky's nonpartisan judicial elections take place during its general elections. These are usually held in even-numbered years but can be held in odd-numbered years.  While no Judicial terms were set to expire in 2018, an election was held for the 3rd Supreme Court district due to incumbent Justice Daniel J. Venters announcing he would retire from his position in early 2019.

District 3

Candidates
Debra Hembree Lee (Non-Aligned), former judge on the Kentucky Court of Appeals, representing the 3rd Appellate District, Division 1 from 2015 to 2018.
Daniel Ballou (Non-Aligned), chief circuit judge for the 34th Judicial Circuit in Kentucky, first elected in 2008.
Results

Kentucky Court of Appeals

District 5, Division 1

District 7, Division 2

Ballot Measures and Amendments
The Constitution of Kentucky does not provide for citizen-initiated ballot measures and referendums at the state level.  Under the state Constitution, aside from Constitutional amendments, approval from the Kentucky General Assembly is required to put anything to a statewide vote.

 Senate Bill 3 - Results declared invalid by order of the Kentucky Supreme Court
 A Legislatively referred constitutional amendment which was a type of Marsy's Law, which would have added a new section to the Kentucky Constitution regarding the rights of victims accused of a crime.  The amendment appeared on the ballot, and was approved with 63% in favor and 37% opposed, however the Kentucky Supreme Court, in a unanimous decision, barred Secretary of State Allison Lundergan Grimes from certifying the election results, declaring "Our constitution is too important and valuable to be amended without the full amendment ever being put to the public." The ruling also stated, "We hold that Section 256 of the Kentucky Constitution requires the General Assembly to submit the full text of a proposed constitutional amendment to the electorate for a vote. Likewise, Section 257 requires the secretary of state to publish the full text of the proposed amendment at least ninety days before the vote. Because the form of the amendment that was published and submitted to the electorate for a vote in this case was not the full text, and was instead a question, the proposed amendment is void."
 House Bill 10 - Failed to gain Legislative Approval
 The Kentucky Legislative Review of Administrative Regulations Amendment (also known as HB 10, or the phonetic acronym "Klara"), was a measure would have authorized the Kentucky General Assembly to establish a process to review any state executive administrative regulation and approve or disapprove the regulation. The measure would have allowed the legislature, or a committee established by the legislature, to review, approve, or disapprove regulations while lawmakers were in session or between sessions.  Proponents argued the amendment was necessary to ensure legislative oversight over the actions of the executive branch, while opponents argued the measure would violate Kentucky's Constitution, which only allows the General Assembly to make binding decisions while in session (a time-frame which is constitutionally confined to between January 1 and May 31, except in emergencies.)  Despite the opposition, the bill passed the House 68-22 (8 abstentions), but failed to receive a vote in the Senate.  As the Amendment did not meet the required 60% threshold in both legislative chambers, it was not included on the 2018 ballot.

Notes

References

 
Kentucky